Uliana Igorevna Batashova (born 16 August 1994) is a Russian modern pentathlete. She is a two-time silver medalist of the World Modern Pentathlon Championships. Batashova ranked second in the Women Senior Pentathlon World Cup Ranking on 27 May 2019.

Bathashova participated at the 2020 Summer Olympics, which took place in Tokyo, Japan in 2020. She led after the riding competition, but finished ninth in the final laser run stage.

References

External links
 

1994 births
Living people
Russian female modern pentathletes
Olympic modern pentathletes of Russia
Modern pentathletes at the 2020 Summer Olympics
Sportspeople from Bashkortostan
21st-century Russian women